Mohamed Youssef  may refer to:

 Mohamed Youssef (basketball) (born 1986), Libyan basketball player
 Mohamed Youssef (football) (born 1970), Egyptian football player
 Mohamed Youssef (sailor) (born 1964), Djibouti sailor
 Mohamed Youssef (swimmer) (born 1963), Egyptian swimmer
 Mohamed Youssef (weightlifter) (born 1956), Egyptian weightlifter
 Mohamed Ismail Youssef (born 1967), Qatar athlete